Halorates is a genus of dwarf spiders that was first described by J. E. Hull in 1911.

Species
 it contains five species, found in China, Kazakhstan, Nepal and Pakistan:
Halorates altaicus Tanasevitch, 2013 – Kazakhstan
Halorates concavus Tanasevitch, 2011 – Pakistan
Halorates crassipalpis (Caporiacco, 1935) – Pakistan, Nepal
Halorates reprobus (O. Pickard-Cambridge, 1879) (type) – Western, Central and Northern Europe
Halorates sexastriatus Fei, Gao & Chen, 1997 – China

See also
 List of Linyphiidae species (A–H)

References

Araneomorphae genera
Linyphiidae
Spiders of Asia